Karla Marie Gray (1947 – 2017) was an American attorney and judge who served as the chief justice of the Montana Supreme Court; she was the first woman to serve as Chief Justice and to be elected to the Montana Supreme Court.

Background
Gray was born in Escanaba, Michigan. She attended Western Michigan University in Kalamazoo from 1965–1970, earning a B.A. and an M.A. in African history.  She then moved to California, working as a clerk matron at the Mountain View Police Department.

She received a J.D. in 1976 from Hastings College of the Law in San Francisco, where she was an editor of the Hastings Law Journal. After law school, she moved to Butte, Montana, where she served as a law clerk for Senior United States District Court Judge William Daniel Murray.

Law career
After her clerkship ended in 1977, Gray practiced law as in-house corporate counsel for Atlantic Richfield and the Montana Power Company as well as in a solo practice. During the 1980s, she was a lobbyist at the Montana Legislature, representing the Montana Trial Lawyers Association, Montana Power Company and related interests.

Governor Stan Stephens appointed Gray as an associate justice of the Montana Supreme Court in 1991, following the resignation of Diane Barz. Barz had been the first woman to serve on the court; Gray then became the second. Gray won election as an associate justice in 1992 and again in 1998. She subsequently became the first woman to be elected Chief Justice in 2000, defeating fellow sitting Justice Terry N. Trieweiler by 8,800 votes out of approximately 387,000 cast. Justice Gray retired from the bench in 2008.

Personal life
Gray and Myron Currie married in Butte in 1979 and remained married until her death in Helena, Montana, on February 19, 2017. The cause of death was cancer. She was 69.

|-

See also
List of female state supreme court justices

References

External links
Obituary in The Montana Standard
Montana Supreme Court profile of Chief Justice Gray
Judicial Profile: Chief Concern, by Howard Rothman.  Equal Justice Magazine, Winter, 2004.
Office seekers file final reports on campaigns, by Erin P. Billings.  Missoulian, November 28, 2000.
Montana Supreme Court chief judge won't seek re-election, by Matt Gouras, April 25, 2007
Gray's 18 years on Montana Supreme Court,Billings Gazette, February 22, 2017.

1947 births
2017 deaths
20th-century American women lawyers
Chief Justices of the Montana Supreme Court
Montana lawyers
People from Escanaba, Michigan
University of California, Hastings College of the Law alumni
Western Michigan University alumni
Women in Montana politics
Women chief justices of state supreme courts in the United States
20th-century American judges
20th-century American lawyers
20th-century American women judges
21st-century American women